Armando La Perra Carrillo (born November 3, 1985) is a Colombian footballer that plays as a striker for Boyacá Chicó.

Honors
Champion with the Club of the National Loperena College of the valley of Upar in all categories of play
A league title
Champion in the Afisa Cup
Champion of the Stars of the Future Tournament
Champion in the Mustang II Cup of 2005
Subchampion in the Mustang I Cup of 2006
Champion with Colombia Sub-21 Selection in the Central American Games and of the Caribbean

External links
 BDFA profile 
 

Living people
1985 births
Colombian footballers
Categoría Primera A players
Deportivo Cali footballers
Atlético Huila footballers
Atlético Bucaramanga footballers
Atlético Nacional footballers
Deportes Tolima footballers
Envigado F.C. players
Boyacá Chicó F.C. footballers
Association football wingers
People from Valledupar